National Secondary Route 105, or just Route 105 (or ) is a National Road Route of Costa Rica, located in the San José province.

Description
In San José province the route covers Escazú canton (Escazú, San Antonio, San Rafael districts), Desamparados canton (San Rafael Abajo district), Alajuelita canton (Alajuelita, San Josecito, San Antonio, Concepción districts).

References

Highways in Costa Rica